Marcos David Mina Lucumí (born 12 April 1999) is a Colombian footballer who currently plays as a defender for Šibenik.

Career statistics

Club

Notes

References

1999 births
Living people
Colombian footballers
Colombian expatriate footballers
Association football defenders
Categoría Primera B players
Croatian Football League players
Deportes Quindío footballers
Boca Juniors de Cali footballers
HNK Šibenik players
Colombian expatriate sportspeople in Croatia
Expatriate footballers in Croatia
Footballers from Cali